Mark Atkinson (born 16 February 1970) is a former association football player who frequently represented New Zealand.

His senior career began with Central United before he moved to Australia to join Carlton S.C. A short stint with Eastern Pride followed before Atkinson was recruited for the Football Kingz' inaugural season the A-League.

Atkinson made his full All Whites debut in a 1–0 win over Fiji on 7 June 1997. He was included in the New Zealand side for the 1999 Confederations Cup finals tournament and he ended his international playing career with 36 A-international caps to his credit, his final cap a substitute appearance in a 5–0 win over Tahiti on 6 June 2001.

References

External links

1970 births
Living people
Carlton S.C. players
Football Kingz F.C. players
Association football midfielders
New Zealand expatriate association footballers
New Zealand international footballers
New Zealand association footballers
National Soccer League (Australia) players
People educated at De La Salle College, Māngere East
Gippsland Falcons players
1998 OFC Nations Cup players
1999 FIFA Confederations Cup players
2000 OFC Nations Cup players
Expatriate soccer players in Australia
New Zealand expatriate sportspeople in Australia